Mike Farbelow (born March 30, 1963, in Saint Paul, Minnesota) is an American curler. He lives in Minneapolis.

Career
Farbelow began curling in 1977. Farbelow made appearances at the United States Men's Curling Championship in 1985, 1998, 2009, 2010, 2011, 2012, and 2013. He served as alternate on Team Jacobson at the 2011 national championships. Farbelow is also the 2007 National club champion, 1985 Minnesota state champion, and the 1981 and 1983 Minnesota junior champion.

Farbelow led his rink to a fifth-place finish in 2009, when he was the winner of the Ann Brown Sportsmanship Award. He then skipped his team to a silver medal at the 2010 U.S. Men's Championships, where they lost the gold medal match to Pete Fenson's rink. It was Farbelow's fourth trip to the U.S. championships and his first medal finish.  Farbelow played in the 2009 United States Olympic Curling Trials.

Farbelow is currently President of Medistim USA Inc.

Personal life
Farbelow is a graduate of the University of Minnesota, and is employed with Medistim where he serves as President of the US team. 

Farbelow's father Bill served as national technical director of the U.S. Curling Association in the 1990s.

References

External links
 

1963 births
Living people
American male curlers
Sportspeople from Minneapolis
Sportspeople from Saint Paul, Minnesota